William Pinckney Reinhardt House, also known as the Pink Reinhardt House, Reinhardt-Sigmon House, and Sigmon House, is a historic home located near Maiden, Catawba County, North Carolina. It was built about 1845, and is a two-story, Greek Revival style frame dwelling. The front facade features center bay portico supported by two
stuccoed-brick Doric order columns and a sophisticated Asher Benjamin-inspired doorway.  It has a -story frame addition built in the 1920s.  It is nearly identical to the neighboring Franklin D. Reinhardt House.

It was listed on the National Register of Historic Places in 1990.

References

Houses on the National Register of Historic Places in North Carolina
Houses completed in 1845
Greek Revival houses in North Carolina
Houses in Catawba County, North Carolina
National Register of Historic Places in Catawba County, North Carolina